Ogbonnaya Onu  (born 1 December 1951) is a Nigerian politician, author and engineer. He was the first civilian governor of Abia State and was minister of Science, Technology and Innovation of Nigeria from November 2015 till his resignation in 2022. He was the longest serving Minister of the ministry.

Life and education 
Ogbonnaya Onu was born on December 1, 1951, to the family of Eze David Aba Onu in Amata, Uburu, Ohaozara Local Government Area of then Eastern region, later Imo State, then Abia State and now Ebonyi State Nigeria. He started his education at Izzi High School in Abakaliki, now the Ebonyi State capital. Here, he obtained grade one with distinction in his West African School Certificate Examination. He also sat for the High School Examination at College of Immaculate Conception (C.I.C) Enugu, graduating as the overall best student. He proceeded to the University of Lagos and graduated with a first class degree in Chemical Engineering in 1976. He went for his doctoral studies at the University of California, Berkeley and obtained a Doctor of Philosophy degree in Chemical Engineering in 1980.

Career

Teaching career 
After his graduation from the University of Lagos, Ogbonnaya Onu became a teacher at St. Augustine's Seminary, Ezzamgbo, Ebonyi State. After the completion of his doctoral studies at the University of California, Berkeley, Onu became a lecturer in the Department of Chemical Engineering at the University of Port Harcourt, and later became the pioneer Head of the Department. He also served as the Acting Dean of the Faculty of Engineering and was also elected as a Member of the Governing Council of the University.

Political career 
Ogbonnaya Onu started his political Career as an aspirant for a Senatorial seat in the old Imo State on the platform of the National Party of Nigeria (NPN). He contested for the position of Governor of Abia State in 1991 under the umbrella of the National Republican Convention and won. He was sworn in as the first Executive Governor of the State in January 1992. He was the first chairman, Conference of Nigerian elected Governors. In 1999, he was the Presidential flag bearer for the All People's Party but relinquished the position to Olu Falae after a merger of his party with the Alliance for Democracy who lost to Olusegun Obasanjo of the PDP. He became the National Party Chairman of the All Nigerian People's Party 2010. In 2013, he his party (ANPP) successfully merged with the Action Congress of Nigeria (ACN), Congress for Progressive Change (CPC), Democratic People's Party (DPP) and some members of the All Progressives Grand Alliance (APGA) to form the All Progressives Congress (APC). In November 2015, he was appointed Minister of Science and Technology by President Muhammadu Buhari. on August 21, 2019, He was sworn in again as Minister of Science and Technology by President Muhammadu Buhari.

Awards and achievements 
Onu is a certified member of Council for the Regulation of Engineering in Nigeria, a fellow of the Nigerian Academy of Engineering, fellow of the Nigerian Society of Chemical Engineers. As a Minister of Science and Technology, he began the National Science and Technology Week which held its first edition on 13 to 17 April 2017 in Abuja and then in March 2018 to showcase inventors and inventions. He signed a Memorandum of Undertaking (MOU) with three international companies to export indigenous technologies and food. He also signed an agreement with NASCO to kick off commercial production of High Nutrient Density biscuits. In 2016, he initiated a programme tagged "774 YOUNG NIGERIAN SCIENTISTS PRESIDENTIAL award (774-YONSPA)" aimed at encouraging and developing the interest of Nigerian youth in science, technology, and innovation (STI).

In October 2022, a Nigerian national honour of Commander of the Order of the Niger (CON) was conferred on him by President Muhammadu Buhari.

Controversies 
Onu said Nigeria will begin local production of pencils by 2018 which he said will provide 400,000 jobs. As of 2019, the said production of pencils has not commenced. In 1999, prior to the Presidential election and the alliance between the All People's Party and Alliance for Democracy, Onu was involved in a conflict involving both APP/AD picking Olu Falae as the joint presidential flag bearer.

See also
List of people from Ebonyi State
Federal Ministry of Science, Technology and Innovation
Cabinet of Nigeria

References

Living people
Governors of Abia State
Lists of state governors of Nigeria
University of Lagos alumni
University of California, Berkeley alumni
1951 births
People from Ebonyi State
Writers from Ebonyi State
Nigerian chemical engineers
Chemical engineering academics